Sama Fornah (born 10 March 1972) is a Sierra Leonean sprinter. She competed in the women's 4 × 100 metres relay at the 1996 Summer Olympics.

References

External links
 

1972 births
Living people
Athletes (track and field) at the 1996 Summer Olympics
Sierra Leonean female sprinters
Olympic athletes of Sierra Leone
Athletes (track and field) at the 1994 Commonwealth Games
Commonwealth Games competitors for Sierra Leone
Place of birth missing (living people)
Olympic female sprinters